Egg Harbor School District may refer to:
Egg Harbor City School District
Egg Harbor Township Schools